Nemanja Supić (Cyrillic: Немања Супић; born 12 January 1982) is a Bosnian retired professional footballer who played as a goalkeeper.

Club career
Born in Gacko, Supić started out at his hometown club Mladost Gacko. He made seven appearances in the 2002–03 season, as the team suffered relegation from the top flight. In the 2004–05 season, Supić moved across the board and joined Serbia and Montenegro second-tier club Radnički Obrenovac.

In the summer of 2008, Supić signed with newly promoted Serbian SuperLiga side Javor Ivanjica. He enjoyed a breakthrough season in 2008–09, helping his team to a highest ever fourth-place finish. In June 2009, Supić was transferred to Cypriot club Anorthosis, but was released after less than two months. He subsequently moved to Romanian side Politehnica Timișoara.

In early 2011, Supić returned to Serbia and rejoined Javor Ivanjica until the end of the season. He later switched to Vojvodina, playing regularly over the next two seasons.

In August 2015, Supić was signed by Red Star Belgrade. He retired from professional football after the 2018–19 season.

International career
Supić made his international debut for Bosnia and Herzegovina under manager Miroslav Blažević during the World Cup 2010 qualifiers, helping the team to a 4–2 away win over Belgium on 28 March 2009. He made seven more appearances that year, as Bosnia and Herzegovina placed second in UEFA's qualifying Group 5, only behind Spain. However, they were eliminated by Portugal in the play-offs. His final international was an October 2009 World Cup qualification match against Spain.

Honours
Red Star Belgrade
 Serbian SuperLiga: 2015–16, 2017–18, 2018–19

References

External links
 
 
 

1982 births
Living people
People from Gacko
Serbs of Bosnia and Herzegovina
Association football goalkeepers
Bosnia and Herzegovina footballers
Bosnia and Herzegovina international footballers
FK Mladost Gacko players
FK Radnički Obrenovac players
FK Bežanija players
FK Zemun players
FK Čukarički players
FK Voždovac players
FK Javor Ivanjica players
Anorthosis Famagusta F.C. players
FC Politehnica Timișoara players
FK Vojvodina players
FK Novi Pazar players
Red Star Belgrade footballers
Red Star Belgrade non-playing staff
Premier League of Bosnia and Herzegovina players
First League of the Republika Srpska players
Second League of Serbia and Montenegro players
First League of Serbia and Montenegro players
Serbian SuperLiga players
Serbian First League players
Liga I players
Bosnia and Herzegovina expatriate footballers
Expatriate footballers in Serbia and Montenegro
Bosnia and Herzegovina expatriate sportspeople in Serbia and Montenegro
Expatriate footballers in Serbia
Bosnia and Herzegovina expatriate sportspeople in Serbia
Expatriate footballers in Cyprus
Bosnia and Herzegovina expatriate sportspeople in Cyprus
Expatriate footballers in Romania
Bosnia and Herzegovina expatriate sportspeople in Romania